Měšťanský pivovar v Poličce is a traditional town brewery in Polička, Czech Republic founded in 1517.

The products include:
 light beer 10° – Hradební
 dark beer 10° – Hradební
 light lager beer 11° – Otakar
 light lager beer 12° – Záviš
 light lager beer 11° – Otakar – yeasty
 light lager beer 12° – Záviš – yeasty

See also 
List of oldest companies

References 

Article contains translated text from Pivovar Polička on Czech Wikipedia retrieved on 25 February 2017.

External links 
Homepage

Breweries in the Czech Republic
Companies established in the 16th century
16th-century establishments in Bohemia